Nyaturu may refer to:
the Nyaturu people
the Nyaturu language